Yarysh-mardy (Yaraşmärda) is a rural locality (a selo) in Shatoysky District in Chechnya.

Geography
The village is located on the right bank of the Argun river, 36 kilometers south of Grozny and 27 kilometers southeast of Urus-Martan.

The nearest settlements are Chishki in the north-west, Dachu-Borzoy in the north-east and Ulus-Kert in the east.

History
The village of Yarysh-Mardy was founded in 1870.

In 1944, after the deportation of the Chechens and Ingush and the abolition of the Checheno-Ingush ASSR, the village of Yarysh-Mardy was renamed to Alabaster and settled by people from neighbouring Dagestan.

In 1977, the village was renamed back to Yarysh-Mardy.

During the first Chechen war in April 1996, the infamous Shatoy ambush took place when Chechen fighters, led by Khattab, ambushed and wrecked a Russian army column.

On January 1, 2020, the village was transferred from the Groznensky District to the Shatoysky District.

Population
 1990 Census: 277
 2002 Census: 0
 2010 Census: 49
 2012 Census: 54
 2014 Census: 60
 2022 Census: 71

References

Rural localities in Shatoysky District